The 2005 Cal Poly Mustangs football team represented California Polytechnic State University during the 2005 NCAA Division I-AA football season.

Cal Poly competed in the Great West Football Conference (GWFC). The Mustangs were led by fifth-year head coach Rich Ellerson and played home games at Mustang Stadium in San Luis Obispo, California. The team finished the regular season as co-champion of the GWFC, with a record of eight wins and three losses (8–3, 4–1 GWFC).

At the end of the season, the Mustangs qualified for the Division I-AA playoffs. In the first playoff game they defeated Montana. In the quarterfinal playoff game they were defeated by Texas State. That brought their final record to nine wins and four losses (9–4, 4–1 GWFC). The Mustangs outscored their opponents 354–232 for the season.

Schedule

Team players in the NFL
The following Cal Poly Mustang players were selected in the 2006 NFL Draft.

Notes

References

Cal Poly
Cal Poly Mustangs football seasons
Great West Conference football champion seasons
Cal Poly Mustangs football